Creation Between Two Surfaces is the second feature film by Iranian independent filmmaker Hossein Rajabian.  It was written and directed by Rajabian using digital cinema technology, as was his first film "The Upside-down Triangle", but this one is in color. The film was produced after his probation in 2019, when he was in an artistic ban. This film was banned by Iranian government and has not been screened anywhere.

Synopsis 
A man is tormented by the knowledge that he carries a gene that will make him go mad and end up in a mental hospital, like his father. With his wife, he enlists in a state-run psychological experiment that is threatening and manipulative. Lies, fear and repression control their lives until they decide to fight for their freedom.

Censorship 
After his sentence for making "The Upside-down Triangle", Rabjabian did not requested a license from any government entity for making or distributing films.

Release for protest 
This film is in line with Iranian popular protests which culminated in November 2019, and was released on the internet for free in February 2020 by Rajabian as a show against censorship and in sympathy with the protesting people.

Gallery

Sources and external links 

 
Film On Youtube
OMDB
 Keyhan Life
Radio Farda news
VOA Farsi news package
 
 Trailer Creation between Two Surfaces
BBC Culture
NYTIMES

References 

Iranian drama films
Persian-language films
Films shot in Iran
Films set in Iran
2010s avant-garde and experimental films
Kurdish films
Iranian independent films
Iranian black-and-white films